Locust is the third studio album by Trust Obey, self-released on in 1990.

Reception
Factsheet Five described Locust as "modern music directed against old spirits of nature" that "has the enigmatic depth of Trust Obey's other works, instrumental throughout and with a manic energy."

Track listing

Personnel
Adapted from the Locust liner notes.

Trust Obey
 John Bergin – instruments

Release history

References

External links 
 Locust at Discogs (list of releases)

1990 albums
Trust Obey albums